Model 204 (M204) is a database management system for IBM and compatible mainframe computers developed and commercialized by Computer Corporation of America. It was announced in 1965, and first deployed in 1972. It incorporates a programming language and an environment for application development.  Implemented in assembly language for IBM System/360 and its successors, M204 can deal with very large databases and transaction loads of 1000 TPS.

Product description
Model 204 relies on its own type of bitmap index, originally devised by Bill Mann, and combines the use of hash table, B-tree, and partitioned record list technologies to optimize speed and efficiency of database access.

It has been described as "one of the three major inverted-list [database
systems] ... the other two being" ADABAS and ADR's Datacom/DB.

Although M204 is a pre-SQL (and pre-relational) database product, it is possible to manually map the files of an M204 database to approximate SQL equivalents and provide some limited SQL functionality using Model 204 SQL Server.

Users 
Model 204 is commonly used in government and military applications. 

It is used commercially in the UK by Marks & Spencer.  It is also used at the Ventura County Property Tax system in California, the Harris County, Texas, Justice Information Management System, and in the New York City Department of Education's Automate The Schools system.  An informal list of past and present Model 204 users, compiled in 2010, identified more than 140 organizations worldwide. Beginning in 1986, it was used by the US Navy Fleet Intelligence Center Europe and Atlantic (FICEURLANT).

Model 204 has been a central part of Australian social security for decades. Services Australia have used it for their ISIS system that pays over $110 billion in welfare payments to around 6 million Australians. A 1.5 billion Australian dollar project to replace ISIS was expected to be completed in 2022 but has experienced delays.

Corporate information
Add-on products for Model 204 database were formerly available from Sirius Software, Inc.

Sirius, located in Cambridge, Massachusetts, USA, was acquired by Rocket Software in 2012.

See also 
Entity-attribute-value model

References

External links 
Model 204 at Rocket Software
Model 204 at Sirius Software
An example of Model 204 User Language programming

Proprietary database management systems
IBM mainframe software